Melvin Matthias Stuessy (August 8, 1901 – October 2, 1980) was an American football tackle who played one season with the Chicago Cardinals of the National Football League. He played college football at St. Edward's University. He served as mayor of Woodstock, Illinois from 1967 to 1973. He died in 1980.

References

External links
Just Sports Stats

1901 births
1980 deaths
Players of American football from Wisconsin
American football tackles
American football guards
St. Edward's Crusaders football players
Chicago Cardinals players
People from Woodstock, Illinois
People from Belleville, Wisconsin